Derenbourg is a surname derived from Derenburg. Notable people with the surname include:

Hartwig Derenbourg (1844–1908), French orientalist
Joseph Derenbourg (1811–1895), French-German orientalist

See also
Dernburg